William Otis Gregg was sixth bishop of the Episcopal Diocese of Eastern Oregon from 2000 to 2007. He was consecrated on September 23, 2000.

References 
Episcopal Clerical Directory 2015

External links 
Bishop announces resignation, move to North Carolina

Living people
Year of birth missing (living people)
Episcopal Church in Oregon
Episcopal Church in North Carolina
Episcopal bishops of North Carolina
Episcopal bishops of Eastern Oregon